Perils of the Wild is a 1925 American silent adventure film serial directed by Francis Ford. The film is considered to be lost.  This serial was based on the 1812 novel The Swiss Family Robinson by Johann David Wyss.

Cast

Production
Bonomo performed his own stunts.  He fractured his leg and received an injured sacroiliac during filming.

Chapter titles

The Hurricane
The Lion’s Fangs
The Flaming Jungle
The Treasure Cave
Saved by the Sun
The Jungle Trail
Pirate Peril
Winds of Fate
Rock of Revenge
The Rescue
The Stolen Wedding
Marooned
Prisoners of the Sea
The Leopard’s Lair
In the Nick of Time

See also
 List of film serials
 List of film serials by studio
 List of lost films
 Boris Karloff filmography

References

External links

Perils of the Wild at silentera.com

1925 films
1925 adventure films
American silent serial films
American black-and-white films
American independent films
American adventure films
Films based on The Swiss Family Robinson
Lost American films
Pirate films
Films directed by Francis Ford
1920s English-language films
1920s American films
Silent adventure films
1920s independent films